Justin Lanning is a Los Angeles-based singer/songwriter. He began singing at age nine.

Career
In 2008, his single Take My Breath Away was listed on the Billboard Hot Dance Club Play Chart. It entered the chart at #45 on 28 June 2008 spending two weeks at its highest position of  #13. It spent at least 11 weeks on the chart.

References 

American singer-songwriters
American male singer-songwriters
1985 births
Living people
21st-century American singers
21st-century American male singers